Coca-Cola Bottling Shqipëria formerly known as Coca-Cola Bottling Enterprise Tirana (CCBET) is an Albanian-based company engaged in bottling and distribution of Coca-Cola soft drink brands in partnership with Sibeg and Acies groups.

The company operates since 1994 in the country, when it produced the first Coca-Cola bottle there. Through the production chain and the local business network, there was built an organisation with more than 300 employees in its structure. Considering the size and distribution network, CCBS represents one of the main proactive actors for the developing of the Albanian economy.

Brand includes Coca-Cola, Coca-Cola Zero, Fanta, Sprite, Schweppes, Cappy Pulpy (Imported from Romania), Nestea (Imported from Greece), Efes Beer (imported from Turkey) and Monster Energy (imported from Romania).

See also 
 Economy of Albania
 Companies of Albania

References

External links 
Official Website
 

Coca-Cola bottlers
Food and drink companies established in 1994
Food and drink companies of Albania